Proshapalopus is a genus of South American tarantulas that was first described by Cândido Firmino de Mello-Leitão in 1923.

Species
 it contains four species, found in Colombia and Brazil:
Proshapalopus amazonicus Bertani, 2001 – Brazil
Proshapalopus anomalus Mello-Leitão, 1923 (type) – Brazil
Proshapalopus marimbai Perafán & Valencia-Cuéllar, 2018 – Colombia
Proshapalopus multicuspidatus (Mello-Leitão, 1929) – Brazil

See also
 List of Theraphosidae species

References

Theraphosidae genera
Spiders of Brazil
Taxa named by Cândido Firmino de Mello-Leitão
Theraphosidae